Ighil Ali is a town in northern Algeria.

Notable people
Mouloud Kacem Naît Belkacem (1927-1992), politician and philosopher
 Jean Amrouche (1906-1962), writer, poet and journalist

Communes of Béjaïa Province
Béjaïa Province